Al-Arsh ( Al-ʿArsh 'the Throne') is the throne of God in Islamic theology. It is believed to be the largest of all the creations of God.

Quran
The Quran mentions the throne some 25 times (33 times as Al-Arsh), such as in verse Q10:3 and Q23:116:

The Quran depicts the angels as carrying the throne of God and praising his glory, similar to Old Testament images.

The Ayat al-Kursi (often glossed as "Verse of the footstool"), is a verse from Al-Baqara, the second sura of the Quran, and is regarded as the book's greatest verse. It references the Kursi (كرسي) which is different from the Throne [عرش], and also God's greatest name, Al-Hayy Al-Qayyoom ("The Living, the Eternal").

Hadith

Sunni
Sunni prophetic hadith establish that The Throne is above the roof of Al-Firdaus Al-'Ala, the highest level of Paradise where God's closest and most beloved servants in the hereafter shall dwell.

Sunni scholars of hadith have stated that Muhammad said the reward for reciting Ayatul Kursi after every prayer is Paradise, and that reciting it is a protection from the devil.

Characteristics 
 Its breadth has been described as the Seven Heavens is like a ring in a desert in relation to the Kursi or the footstool of Allah, and likewise the Kursi is like a ring in a desert in relation to "the Throne", On the authority of Abu Dharr al-Ghifari, he said:  
 The Throne is the highest of all creatures, and it was primarily on the water. The Quran says: ، and on the authority of Abdullah ibn Masud he said:
 It is the heaviest of all creatures. On the authority of Juwayriya bint al-Harith she said:
 that he has lists;As in the Hadith:

Views

Sufi 
 

Sufi Muslims believe God created the throne as a sign of his power and not as place of dwelling.

Abu Mansur al-Baghdadi (d. 429/1037) in his al-Farq bayn al-Firaq (The Difference between the Sects) reports that 'Ali ibn Abi Talib, said: "God created the Throne as an indication of His power, not for taking it as a place for Himself." The vast majority of Islamic scholars, including Sunnis (Ash'aris, Maturidis and Sufis), Mu'tazilis, and Shi'is (Twelvers and Isma'ilis) believe  the Throne ( al-'Arsh) as a symbol of God's power and authority and not as a dwelling place for Himself, others describe it as an allegory, and many others said that the heart of the believer is the Throne of Allah (قلب المممن عرش الله), a quote criticized by Salafi Muslim scholars.

Salafi 
some Islamic sects, such as the Karramis and the Salafis/Wahhabis believe that God has created it as a place of dwelling.

Bearers of the Throne
Bearers of the Throne or ḥamlat al-arsh (حملة العرش) are a group of angels in Islam. In Islamic traditions, they are often portrayed in zoomorphic forms. They are described as resembling different creatures: An eagle, a bull, a lion and a human. Other hadiths describes them with six wings and four faces. While according to a hadith transmitted from At-Targhib wat-Tarhib authored by ʻAbd al-ʻAẓīm ibn ʻAbd al-Qawī al-Mundhirī, the bearers of the throne were angels who shaped like a rooster, with their feet on the earth and their nape supporting the Throne of God in the highest sky. a number modern Islamic scholars from Imam Mohammad Ibn Saud Islamic University , and other institutes Yemen and Mauritania also agreed the soundness of this hadith by quoting the commentary from Ibn Abi al-Izz who supported this narrative.

These four angels are also held to be created from different elements: One from light, one from fire, one from water and one from mercy. It is also said they are so large that a journey from their earlobes to their shoulders would take seven hundred years. According to various Islamic tafsir scholars which compiled by Islamic University of Madinah and Indonesian religious ministry, the number of these angels will be added from four into eight angels during the Day of Resurrection. This interpretation were based on Qur'an chapter Al-Haqqa .

According to Al-Suyuti who quoted a Hadith which transmitted by Ibn al-Mubarak, archangel Israfil is one of the bearer of the throne.

See also
 Throne of God

Note

References

Thrones
Islamic terminology